Never Never Land is a single from Lyfe Jennings from his third studio album Lyfe Change.

Charts

Weekly charts

Year-end charts

References

2008 singles
2008 songs
Columbia Records singles
Lyfe Jennings songs
Songs written by Lyfe Jennings